Yi Lu Murphey is an electrical engineer at the University of Michigan, Dearborn. She was named a Fellow of the Institute of Electrical and Electronics Engineers (IEEE) in 2014 for her contributions to optimal energy control in hybrid electric vehicles.

References 

Fellow Members of the IEEE
Living people
21st-century American engineers
American electrical engineers
American women engineers
Year of birth missing (living people)
University of Michigan alumni